AKM Khalequzzaman Khan Humayun was a Bangladesh Muslim League politician and the former Member of Parliament of Kishoreganj-6.

Early life
Khalequzzaman was born into a Bengali Muslim family in Bajitpur, Kishoreganj, Mymensingh District.

Career
Ahmed stood up for the 1986 Bangladeshi general elections as a Bangladesh Muslim League candidate for the newly renamed Kishoreganj-6 (Bhairab-Kuliarchar) constituency. During the 1988 Bangladeshi general elections, Ahmed was defeated by Combined Opposition candidate Khandakar Mofizur Rahman and came second place. He was again defeated at the 1991 Bangladeshi general elections by Bangladesh Nationalist Party politician Aamir Uddin Ahmod and came third place.

References

Bangladesh Muslim League politicians
Living people
3rd Jatiya Sangsad members
Year of birth missing (living people)
People from Kishoreganj District